Khara-Khuzhir (Khara Khujar) is a rural locality (an ulus) in Okinsky District, Republic of Buryatia, Russia. The population was 214 as of 2010. There are 4 streets.

Geography 
Khara-Khuzhir is located 15 km north of Orlik (the district's administrative centre) by road. Orlik is the nearest rural locality.

References 

Rural localities in Okinsky District